Lohmühlenstraße is a public transport metro station for the rapid transit trains on the line U1 located in Hamburg, Germany in the quarter St. Georg in the Hamburg-Mitte borough.

The station is close to the St. Georg hospital and the main campus of the Hamburg University of Applied Sciences.

Station layout 
The station is underground with an island platform. There are two exits at its ends. In the entrance level is a shop but no lockerboxes. No personnel is attending the station but there are ticket machines, CCTV, and emergency and information telephones.

See also 
Hamburger Verkehrsverbund (Public transport association for the Hamburg area)
Hamburger Hochbahn (Operator of the Hamburg U-Bahn)

References

External links

 Line and route network plans at hvv.de 

Hamburg U-Bahn stations in Hamburg
U1 (Hamburg U-Bahn) stations
Buildings and structures in Hamburg-Mitte
Railway stations in Germany opened in 1961
1961 establishments in West Germany